Janet Joyce is a pseudonym used for the partnership of American writers Janet Bieber and Joyce Thies. Together they have written more than 15 romance novels.

Bibliography

As Janet Joyce

Single novels
Conquer memories,	1982/06
Libertine Lady,	1983/02
Man of the house,	1983/05
Man of glory,	1983/10
Controlling interest,	1984/01
Fields of promise,	1984/02
Permanent fixture,	1984/03
Run to gold,	1984/05
Rare breed,	1984/10
Secrets of the heart,	1985/03
Out of shadows,	1985/03
Glorious destiny,	1985/08
Out of this world,	1986/01
Courting trouble,	1986/10

Men Made in America series (multi-author)
23. Winter Lady,	1983/02

As Jenna Lee Joyce

Single novels
Wintersfield,	1984/12
Crossroads,	1985/05
One on one,	1985/10
A package deal,	1986/06
Awake unto me,	1986/12

References and sources

Jenna Lee Joyce's Webpage in Fantastic Fiction's Website

20th-century American novelists
American romantic fiction writers